Katalonia is a village and a community of the Katerini municipality in Greece. Before the 2011 local government reform it was part of the municipality of Elafina, of which it was a municipal district. The 2011 census recorded 396 inhabitants in the village.

References

External links 

 

Populated places in Pieria (regional unit)